Piscibacillus salipiscarius is a Gram-positive, spore-forming, strictly aerobic moderately halophilic and motile bacterium from the genus of Piscibacillus which has been isolated from pla-ra in Thailand.

References

 

Bacillaceae
Bacteria described in 2007